Słupcza  is a village in the administrative district of Gmina Dwikozy, within Sandomierz County, Świętokrzyskie Voivodeship, in south-central Poland.

During the January Uprising, on 8 February 1863, the Battle of Słupcza was fought nearby between Polish insurgents and Russian troops.

References

Villages in Sandomierz County
Radom Governorate
Kielce Voivodeship (1919–1939)